Greater Vienna was the name given to an enlarged version of Vienna. First attempts at the formation of Greater Vienna already date back to the times of the Habsburg monarchy. After the Anschluss of Austria into Nazi Germany in 1938, Vienna was expanded to "the largest city of the Reich by area".

Nowadays the term "Greater Vienna" is mainly used to distinguish the larger region around Vienna, which was enlarged during the Nazi era, from the present-day city. In 1954 during the Allied occupation of Austria, the extensions were mostly reverted to its pre-annexation state.

See also
 Greater Berlin Act
 Greater Hamburg Act

References

1938 establishments in Austria
1954 disestablishments in Austria
Geography of Vienna
1930s in Vienna
1940s in Vienna
1950s in Vienna
Austria under National Socialism